Dušan Živković (born 31 July 1996) is a Serbian football player who plays as a midfielder for Rudar Pljevlja in the Montenegrin First League.

Career

Red Star Belgrade
Dušan was licensed for the first team of Red Star under coach Ricardo Sá Pinto in 2013, before the last fixture of the 2012–13 against Vojvodina, but he was not in protocol. He stayed with youth team until summer 2015, when he impressed coach Božović on the summer preparations, before the 2015–16, who decided to send him on loan to get more experience. In summer 2016, he terminated contract and left the club.

Loans
Živković and Marinković was loaned to Spartak Subotica at the beginning of season 2015–16. Dušan made his official debut for Spartak Subotica in the 1st fixture of Serbian SuperLiga, against Radnik Surdulica, played on 18 July 2015. After only several matches for Spartak, he returnted to Belgrade. Živković spent the rest of 2015–16 on loan at Bežanija.

Radnički Niš
On 21 July 2016, Živković signed a three-year contract with Radnički Niš.

Rudar Pljevlja
On 8 February 2021, he signed with Rudar Pljevlja in Montenegro.

Career statistics

References

External links
 Dušan Živković stats at utakmica.rs 
 

1996 births
Sportspeople from Leskovac
Living people
Serbian footballers
Association football midfielders
Serbia youth international footballers
FK Spartak Subotica players
FK Bežanija players
FK Radnički Niš players
FK Rad players
FK Rudar Pljevlja players
Serbian First League players
Serbian SuperLiga players
Montenegrin First League players
Serbian expatriate footballers
Expatriate footballers in Montenegro
Serbian expatriate sportspeople in Montenegro